L'Alcúdia is a town and municipality in the province of Valencia, Spain. It is located on the left bank of the river Xúquer.

History
The locality is named after a 13th-century Moorish farmhouse, granted in 1238 by the Aragonese king Jaume I (James I) to Pere de Montagut. On January 17, 1252 this latter conceded the right to found a township upon these lands to 54 Christian pioneers after the Reconquista of the Valencian Moorish territories. The town was involved in many of the conflicts that shook Spain throughout its history: it was sacked during the "Revolta de les Germanies" in the beginning of the 16th century; in the 18th century, during the War of the Spanish Succession, the Bourbon troops plundered it again, and finally, during the Peninsular War it lodged a camp of French troops that looted everything from the villagers, leaving them in debt. During the Spanish Civil War, it was lucky to keep on the rearguard, although this did not spare the town from being bombed by Italian fascist planes, supporting Franco’s uprising.

A former name for this locality in Spanish is Alcudia de Carlet, which was in use during Franco's regime. After Franco's death in 1975 and the institution of democracy in Spain, the name fell into disfavor and the population unanimously voted to change it.

Economic resources
Up to not many years ago the town relied almost exclusively on its agriculture production (mainly oranges and vegetables), some years ago a new and pretty exotic product was re-introduced into the orchards of l'Alcudia and the surrounding district, the caqui (Persimmon) which has become a major source of revenue for Alcudian growers. 
l'Alcúdia has recently become an industrial town, with a number of factories producing furniture and general light industry. But undoubtedly the most important company in l'Alcudia is Istobal, a leading Spanish company in the design, manufacture and marketing of car wash solutions for the Automotive industry.

Main sights
Notable architectural structures in the municipality include:

 The Franciscan convent, ca. 1600, in ruins but with plans for restoration in progress
 Church of the Immaculada (Verge de la Purisima) in Montortal, 17th century.
 Church of Sant Andreu.
 The Waterwheel (La Noria), dating from the 19th century,
 La Mota, an aqueduct from the 19th century that pumped water from the Royal Irrigation Canal of the river Xuquer and provided water to almost the whole zone
 The House of Culture, inaugurated in 1987, a modern and singular building.
 L'Hort de Manus, where the Verge of the Church of Sant Andreu was reportedly hidden under a cattle trough during the Spanish Civil War

Notable people
Andrés Palop, former footballer
Voro, former footballer and former assistant manager of Valencia.

References

External links
 

Municipalities in the Province of Valencia
Ribera Alta (comarca)